John Randle Hamilton (born 1944) is an American diplomat. He served as United States Ambassador to Peru from 1999 to 2002, and as United States Ambassador to Guatemala from 2003 to 2005.

Early life and education
He graduated from the University of North Carolina at Chapel Hill in 1967, and received an M.A. in Latin American Studies from Stanford University in 1982. From 1968 to 1970, he served in the U.S. Naval Reserve.

Career
He served as political counselor in Lima, Peru from 1986 to 1989 and in San José, Costa Rica from 1989 to 1992. He served as the Director of the Office of Central American and Panamanian Affairs from 1992 to 1996, Deputy Assistant Secretary for Central America, the Caribbean and Cuba from 1996 to 1998, and Principal Deputy Assistant Secretary for Western Hemisphere Affairs from 1998 to 1999. He then served as U.S. Ambassador to Peru from 1999 to 2002, and to Guatemala from 2003 to 2005.

Personal life
He is married to Donna, and they have two daughters, Kathryn and Erin.

References

External links

1944 births
Living people
University of North Carolina at Chapel Hill alumni
Stanford University alumni
Ambassadors of the United States to Peru
Ambassadors of the United States to Guatemala